Fairview District Home is a historic almshouse located near Dublin, Pulaski County, Virginia. It was built in 1928, and is large, two-story, "T"-shaped brick Colonial Revival style building. The front facade features a projecting, three-bay, central pavilion with a large pedimented porch.  Also on the property is a contributing two-story, brick garage.  It was established as part of a Governor Harry F. Byrd-era reform of the county almshouse system in Virginia. In the mid-1970s the Fairview Home moved to a modern building on the property and continued to operate as a nursing home.

It was added to the National Register of Historic Places in 1997.

References

Almshouses in the United States
Government buildings on the National Register of Historic Places in Virginia
Colonial Revival architecture in Virginia
Government buildings completed in 1928
Buildings and structures in Pulaski County, Virginia
National Register of Historic Places in Pulaski County, Virginia
1928 establishments in Virginia
Housing in Virginia